USA-145, also known as GPS IIR-3 and GPS SVN-46, is an American navigation satellite which forms part of the Global Positioning System. It was the third Block IIR GPS satellite to be launched, out of thirteen in the original configuration, and twenty one overall. It was built by Lockheed Martin, using the AS-4000 satellite bus.

USA-145 was launched at 12:51:01 UTC on 7 October 1999, atop a Delta II carrier rocket, flight number D275, flying in the 7925-9.5 configuration. The launch took place from Space Launch Complex 17A at the Cape Canaveral Air Force Station, and placed USA-145 into a transfer orbit. The satellite raised itself into medium Earth orbit using a Star-37FM apogee motor.

It is used to broadcast the PRN 11 signal, and operated in slot 2 of plane D of the GPS constellation; however, it had been moved to slot 5 by 2011, with USA-71 covering slot 2. As of 2019 it remains in service.

GPS IIR-3 was originally intended to use satellite SVN-50; however, it was damaged during launch preparations in May 1999 after rainwater leaked into the cleanroom atop SLC-17A where the satellite was being attached to its rocket. SVN-50 was repaired and launched as GPS IIR-21, becoming the last IIR to fly.

References

Spacecraft launched in 1999
GPS satellites
USA satellites